A toll tunnel is a road tunnel where a monetary charge (or toll) is required to pass through.

List of toll tunnels

United States

Alaska

Maryland

Massachusetts

Michigan / Ontario, Canada

New Jersey / New York

New York

Texas

Virginia

Washington

Tolls removed
 Hampton Roads Bridge-Tunnel, between Hampton and Norfolk, Virginia

South Africa
 Huguenot Tunnel, South Africa

United Kingdom
 Dartford Crossing, Kent to Essex
 Kingsway Tunnel, Wallasey to Liverpool
 Queensway Tunnel, Birkenhead to  Liverpool
 Tyne Tunnel, North Shields to South Shields

Ireland
 Dublin Port Tunnel, Dublin
 Limerick Tunnel, Limerick

Australia
 Burnley and Domain Tunnels, CityLink, Melbourne
 Melba and Mullum-Mullum Tunnels, EastLink, Melbourne
 Sydney Harbour Tunnel
 Clem Jones Tunnel, Brisbane Queensland
 Airport Link, Brisbane, Brisbane Queensland
 Legacy Way, Brisbane Queensland

Belgium
 Liefkenshoek Tunnel, Antwerp

Netherlands
 Western Scheldt Tunnel, Terneuzen to Ellewoutsdijk
 Kiltunnel, Dordrecht

Tolls removed
 Beneluxtunnel, Rotterdam

Montenegro
 Sozina Tunnel, Montenegro (2005)

Croatia
 Učka Tunnel, Croatia (1981)

Germany
 Alter Elbtunnel, Hamburg, Germany

Malaysia
 Stormwater Management and Road Tunnel (SMART Tunnel), Kuala Lumpur, Malaysia

Hong Kong
 Aberdeen Tunnel, Happy Valley to Wong Chuk Hang
 Cross-Harbour Tunnel, Kowloon to Victoria
 Eagle's Nest and Sha Tin Heights Tunnels, Lai Chi Kok to Sha Tin
 Eastern Harbour Crossing, Quarry Bay to Cha Kwo Leng / Sai Tso Wan
 Lion Rock Tunnel, Kowloon Tong to Hin Tin
 Shing Mun Tunnels, Tsuen Wan to Sha Tin
 Tai Lam Tunnel, Ting Kau to Pat Heung
 Tate's Cairn Tunnel, Diamond Hill to Siu Lek Yuen
 Western Harbour Crossing, Sai Ying Pun to Kowloon West

Tolls removed
 Tseung Kwan O Tunnel, Sau Mau Ping to Tseung Kwan O

References

+
+Tunnel